The 2005–06 FIS Cross-Country World Cup was the 25th official World Cup season in cross-country skiing for men and women. The season began in Düsseldorf on 22 October 2005 and was concluded in Sapporo on 19 March 2006.

Calendar

Men

Women

Men's team

Women's team

Men's standings

Overall

Distance

Sprint

Women's standings

Overall

Distance

Sprint

Nations Cup

Overall

Men

Women

Points distribution
The World Cup points in the 2005–06 season were awarded according to the following table:

Achievements
Victories in this World Cup (all-time number of victories as of 2005–06 season in parentheses)

Men
 , 5 (6) first places
 , 3 (3) first places
 , 2 (10) first places
 , 2 (9) first places
 , 2 (5) first places
 , 1 (9) first places
 , 1 (6) first place
 , 1 (5) first place
 , 1 (4) first place
 , 1 (3) first place
 , 1 (2) first place
 , 1 (1) first place
 , 1 (1) first place
 , 1 (1) first place
 , 1 (1) first place

Women
 , 6 (26) first places
 , 4 (4) first places
 , 3 (16) first places
 , 2 (18) first places
 , 1 (4) first place
 , 1 (3) first place
 , 1 (2) first place
 , 1 (1) first place
 , 1 (1) first place
 , 1 (1) first place
 , 1 (1) first place
 , 1 (1) first place
 , 1 (1) first place

Retirements

Men

Women

References

External links
 Overview of the season and results at the official website of the International Ski Federation.
 Overall World Cup, men, at the official website of the International Ski Federation.
 Overall World Cup, women, at the official website of the International Ski Federation.

World Cup 2005-06
World Cup 2005-06
FIS Cross-Country World Cup seasons